Nazarkahrizi District is in Hashtrud County, East Azerbaijan province, Iran. At the 2006 National Census, its population was 18,629 in 3,569 households. The following census in 2011 counted 16,046 people in 4,058 households. At the latest census in 2016, the district had 13,736 inhabitants in 4,030 households.

References 

Hashtrud County

Districts of East Azerbaijan Province

Populated places in East Azerbaijan Province

Populated places in Hashtrud County